Indra Birowo (born January 9, 1973) is an actor and comedian, who made his television debut in Extravaganza.

Indra is the third child of Wargandi Suryo and Farida Yusuf. He was educated at Canisius College in Jakarta.

He made his film debut in Bintang Jatuh in 2000. He has gone on to appear in numerous Indonesian movies and soap operas.

Awards and nominations

External links
  Indra Birowo's profile at Kapanlagi.com

1973 births
Living people
Indonesian male comedians
Indonesian comedians
Indonesian male film actors
Javanese people